Digital Thread is defined as “the use of digital tools and representations for design, evaluation, and life cycle management.”

The term 'Digital Thread' was first used in the Global Horizons 2013 report by the USAF Global Science and Technology Vision Task Force.

The term Digital Thread was further refined in 2018 by Singh and Willcox at MIT in their paper entitled Engineering with a Digital Thread. In this academic paper the term Digital Thread is defined as "a data-driven architecture that links together information generated from across the product lifecycle and is envisioned to be the primary or authoritative data and communication platform for a company’s products at any instance of time."   

More narrowly, the digital thread is also used to refer to the lowest level design and specification for a digital representation of a physical item.  The digital thread is a critical capability in model-based systems engineering (MBSE) and the foundation for a digital twin.

The term digital thread is also used to describe the traceability of the digital twin back to the requirements, parts and control systems that make up the physical asset.

References 

Software frameworks